Events in the year 1977 in Mexico.

Incumbents

Federal government
 President: José López Portillo
 Interior Secretary (SEGOB): Jesús Reyes Heroles
 Secretary of Foreign Affairs (SRE): Santiago Roel García 
 Communications Secretary (SCT): Emilio Mújica Montoya
 Education Secretary (SEP): Porfirio Muñoz Ledo/Fernando Solana Morales
 Secretary of Defense (SEDENA): Félix Galván López
 Secretary of Navy: Ricardo Cházaro Lara
 Secretary of Labor and Social Welfare: Pedro Ojeda Paullada
 Secretary of Welfare: Pedro Ramírez Vázquez
 Secretary of Public Education: Porfirio Muñoz Ledo/Fernando Solana Morales
 Tourism Secretary (SECTUR): Guillermo Rossell de la Lama

Supreme Court

 President of the Supreme Court: Mario G. Rebolledo Fernández

Governors

 Aguascalientes: José Refugio Esparza Reyes
 Baja California
Milton Castellanos Everardo, until October 31
Roberto de la Madrid, starting November 1
 Baja California Sur: José Refugio Esparza Reyes
 Campeche: Rafael Rodríguez Barrera
 Chiapas: Jorge de la Vega Domínguez/Salomón González Blanco
 Chihuahua: Manuel Bernardo Aguirre
 Coahuila: Oscar Flores Tapia
 Colima: Arturo Noriega Pizano
 Durango: Héctor Mayagoitia Domínguez
 Guanajuato: Luis H. Ducoing Gamba
 Guerrero: Rubén Figueroa Figueroa
 Hidalgo: José Luis Suárez Molina
 Jalisco: Alberto Orozco Romero/Flavio Romero de Velasco
 State of Mexico: Jorge Jiménez Cantú
 Michoacán: Carlos Torres Manzo
 Morelos: Armando León Bejarano (PRI)
 Nayarit: Rogelio Flores Curiel
 Nuevo León: Pedro Zorrilla Martínez
 Oaxaca: Miguel Zárate Aquino/Eliseo Jiménez Ruiz
 Puebla: Toxqui Fernández de Lara
 Querétaro: Antonio Calzada Urquiza
 Quintana Roo: Jesús Martínez Ross
 San Luis Potosí: Guillermo Fonseca Álvarez
 Sinaloa: Alfonso G. Calderón
 Sonora: Alejandro Carrillo Marcor
 Tabasco: Leandro Rovirosa Wade
 Tamaulipas: Enrique Cárdenas González
 Tlaxcala: Emilio Sánchez Piedras
 Veracruz: Rafael Hernández Ochoa
 Yucatán: Francisco Luna Kan 
 Zacatecas: Fernando Pámanes Escobedo
Regent of Mexico City: Carlos Hank González

Events

 The ubiquitous convenience store chain OXXO is founded. 
 The Monterrey College of Music and Dance is established.
 April 13: Roman Catholic Diocese of Nuevo Casas Grandes established. 
 August 29 – September 4:Hurricane Anita  
 September: Liceo Mexicano Japonés opens its doors in Mexico City.

Awards
Belisario Domínguez Medal of Honor – Juan de Dios Bátiz Peredes

Births
 January 4 – Irán Castillo, Mexican actress and singer
February 28 — Rafael Amaya, actor.
May 2 – Carlos Hermosillo Arteaga, Chihuauhua politician (d. 2017).
May 25 – Alberto Del Rio, pro wrestler
June 29 – Eugenio Polgovsky, filmmaker, winner of Ariel Award (d. 2017).
November 24 – David Alonso López, boxer (d. 2017).

Deaths
October 1 — Victorio Blanco, movie actor (b. 1893)

Film

 List of Mexican films of 1977

Sport

 1976–77 Mexican Primera División season 
 Tecolotes de Nuevo Laredo win the Mexican League
 1977 Central American and Caribbean Championships in Athletics are held in Xalapa.

References

External links

 
Mexico